Derges is a surname. Notable people with the surname include:

 Jack Derges (born 1987), British actor
 Patricia Derges, American politician elected to the Missouri House of Representatives in 2020, charged with 20 crimes in 2021
 Susan Derges (born 1955), British photographic artist